The 1979–80 Ole Miss Rebels men's basketball team represented the University of Mississippi in the 1979–80 NCAA Division I men's basketball season. The Rebels were led by fourth-year head coach, Bob Weltlich. The Rebels played their home games at Tad Smith Coliseum in Oxford, Mississippi as members of the Southeastern Conference.

Roster

Schedule

|-
!colspan=12 style=|SEC tournament

|-
!colspan=9 style=| NIT

Team players drafted into the NBA

References 

Ole Miss
Ole Miss
Ole Miss Rebels men's basketball seasons
Ole Miss Rebels
Ole Miss Rebels